A list of films produced in Italy in 1970 (see 1970 in film):

References

Footnotes

Sources

External links
Italian films of 1970 at the Internet Movie Database

1970
Films
Lists of 1970 films by country or language